The Minor Basilica and Metropolitan Cathedral of the Immaculate Conception, also known as the Manila Cathedral, is the cathedral of Manila and basilica located in Intramuros, the historic walled city within today's modern city of Manila, Philippines. It is dedicated to the Immaculate Conception of the Blessed Virgin Mary as the Patroness of the country. The cathedral serves as the episcopal seat of the Archbishop of Manila.

The cathedral was originally a parish church in Manila under the Archdiocese of Mexico in 1571, until it became a separate diocese on February 6, 1579, upon the issuance of the papal bull  by Pope Gregory XIII. The cathedral was damaged and destroyed several times since the original structure was built in 1581 while the eighth and current structure of the cathedral was completed in 1958.

The basilica has merited a papal endorsement from Pope Gregory XIII and three apostolic visits from Pope Paul VI, Pope John Paul II and Pope Francis. On April 27, 1981, Pope John Paul II issued papal bull  designating the cathedral as a minor basilica by his own .

History

As a parish church (1571)
The cathedral was originally the "church of Manila" officially established in 1571 by a secular priest, Fray Juan de Vivero, who had the honor of baptizing Rajah Matanda, which he arrived in Manila Bay in 1566.  De Vivero, the chaplain on the galleon of San Gerónimo, was sent by the Archbishop of Mexico, Alonso de Montúfar, to establish Christianity as the spiritual and religious administration in newly colonized Philippines. De Vivero later became the vicar-general and the first ecclesiastical judge of the city of Manila. 

Spanish conquistador Miguel López de Legazpi chose the location of the church and placed it under the patronage of Santa Potenciana.  The first parish priest of the church was Fray Juan de Villanueva. The other religious who were pillars of the parish were Juan de Vivaneta and Nicolas Riccio.

First cathedral (1581–1583)
When the church was elevated to a cathedral in 1579 (coinciding with the canonical erection of the Diocese of Manila), a new structure made from nipa, wood, and bamboo was constructed in 1581 by Domingo de Salazar, the first-ever bishop of Manila. It was consecrated on December 21, 1581; formally becoming a cathedral. The structure was destroyed by fire in 1583, which started during the funeral Mass for Governor-General Gonzalo Ronquillo de Peñalosa in San Agustin Church that razed much of the city.

Second cathedral (1592–1600) 
The second cathedral, which was made of stone, was built in 1592. This incarnation of the cathedral had a central nave and two collateral naves. The cathedral was nearly completed when Bishop Salazar left for Spain. He died on December 4, 1594, and never returned to Manila to reign as its first archbishop.

In 1595, sacred relics from 155 martyrs, 20 popes, Saint Polycarp, and Saint Potenciana were given by the Holy See and were brought to Manila. A side structure was built beside the main cathedral to house the relics. Governor-General Juan Niño de Tabora and his wife Doña Magdalena Saldivar y Medoza built another collateral structure to shelter subsequent relics.

By 1597, the cathedral buildings were not finished, as it lacked a chapter hall, baptistry, bell tower, and cloister were still under construction. On December 31, 1600, the cathedral was destroyed by an earthquake.

Third cathedral (1614–1645)
Archbishop Miguel de Benavides initiated the reconstruction of the cathedral. After his death in 1605, the project was passed on to his successor, Diego Vázquez de Mercado. By 1607, the cathedral was in a miserable state that it was abandoned.

Built largely by donated funds from the fourth dean of the cathedral, Don Francisco Gomez de Arellano, the third cathedral structure consisting of three naves and seven chapels was built in 1614. The seven chapels were built from donations given by patrons of the cathedral.

On August 1, 1621, an earthquake caused serious damage on the cathedral's structure. Between 1641 and 1645, the cathedral was reconstructed, but it was destroyed by a series of earthquakes in November and December 1645.

Fourth cathedral (1671–1751)
The reconstruction of the cathedral started after the arrival of Miguel de Poblete Casasola, the eighth Archbishop of Manila. On April 20, 1654, the cornerstone of the fourth cathedral structure was laid. By 1659, the cathedral was nearly completed, as the naves were enclosed, and some halls were completed. In 1662, the main altar was built out of molave wood. The cathedral, made of quarried stone, lime, and gravel, was blessed on June 7, 1662. In 1750, a media naranja ("half orange") dome was added to the crossing by the Florentine friar Juan de Uguccioni, who also introduced a transept to the structure. Following several earthquakes and typhoons, the fourth cathedral was demolished in 1751.

Fifth cathedral (1760–1852)

After the demolition of the fourth structure, work on the fifth cathedral started. It underwent a major transformation under Uguccioni's designs. The three-nave design was retained, but the chapels were reduced. The fifth cathedral, which closely resembled the Church of the Gesù in Rome, was inaugurated on December 8, 1760.

Since its 1760 inauguration, there had been no modifications or alterations to the structure, except for some minor repairs. The cathedral was repaired in 1839, particularly the dome structure.

The cathedral survived the British occupation of Manila, but the structure underwent repairs. It was however damaged by an earthquake on September 16, 1852.

Sixth cathedral (1858–1863)
Bidding for the cathedral reconstruction was conducted in 1854. The reconstructed cathedral, which was the sixth structure built, was opened on March 31, 1858. It sported a new Neoclassical façade, which would be used for the subsequent seventh and eighth structures. It replaced the Baroque façade of the previous cathedral. The dome structure was also replaced, with a circular dome replacing the truncated or box-like cupola used in the previous structure.

On June 3, 1863, the cathedral was damaged by a very strong earthquake that also damaged the palace of the governor general of the Philippines. Many called for the demolition of and clearing of the ruins. Architect Don Antonio Moraleda proposed to demolish and clear the ruins, but the proposal was put on hold in 1866, only to be renewed two yers later. In 1868, another architect, Vicente Serrano y Salaverri, was commissioned to inspect and undertake a study of the ruins. Serrano concluded that the cathedral ruins must be demolished. The sixth cathedral was demolished in 1870.

Seventh cathedral (1879–1945)

The seventh cathedral was constructed from 1870 to 1879. It was solemnly consecrated on December 7, 1879. The cross atop the central dome is a reference point of astronomical longitudes of the archipelago. In 1880, another earthquake toppled its bell tower, which survived the 1863 earthquake, rendering the cathedral towerless until 1958.

During the Philippine Revolution of 1896, Archbishop Bernardino Nozaleda y Villa opened the cathedral to Spanish soldiers who sought refuge. Likewise, during the Philippine–American War, the American soldiers converted it to a hospital for their wounded soldiers.

In 1937, the International Eucharistic Congress was held in the Philippines in which the cathedral played an integral part in promoting eucharistic beliefs. Both a cathedral stamp and medal were unveiled in commemoration of the event and was made by the official manufacturer of medals for the Congress of the Philippines at the time, the sculptor Críspulo Zamora.

This incarnation of the cathedral was reduced to rubble by the Japanese in a scorched-earth defense in 1945 during the Battle of Manila, as the Second World War neared its conclusion.

Eighth cathedral (1958–present)

After the Second World War, archbishops Michael J. O'Doherty and Gabriel Reyes thought of an idea to transfer the seat of the Archdiocese of Manila to Mandaluyong. The idea was dropped when the cathedral was reconstructed from 1954 to 1958 under Archbishop Rufino Cardinal Santos, with the supervision of the notable Kapampangan architect Fernando Ocampo. The present cathedral was consecrated on December 7, 1958.

Pope Paul VI made an apostolic visit and celebrated Mass in the cathedral on November 27, 1970. Pope John Paul II also celebrated Mass in the cathedral on February 17, 1981. Two months later, Pope John Paul II issued a papal bull Quod Ipsum on April 27, 1981, elevating the shrine to a minor basilica through his own Motu Proprio.  In the same papal bull, he reiterated that Pope Paul VI's papal decree of June 6, 1968, be eternally preserved and enforced to the merits and titles of the cathedral as its own basilica.

The cathedral's 50th restoration anniversary was celebrated in 2008, highlighted by the second Manila Cathedral Pipe Organ Festival from December 2 to 10, organized by the Catholic Bishops' Conference of the Philippines. The cathedral's pipe organ itself, which consists of 5,584 pipes, is one of the largest pipe organs in the country and in Southeast Asia.

In February 2011, the cathedral's bells were moved to the ground level to prevent the bell tower from collapsing, as had occurred in past earthquakes. In January 2012, the bells were replaced with new ones personally cast by blacksmith Friedrich Wilhelm Schilling from Heidelberg, Germany in 1958. According to the new marker installed by Archbishop Gaudencio Cardinal Rosales, the newly installed bells are the largest bells actively used in the Philippines.

Following the 2012 Negros earthquake and structural concerns, the cathedral temporarily closed on February 7, 2012 to give way for repairs for earthquake retrofitting and subsidence prevention. During this time, Paco Church was designated as the pro-cathedral of the Archdiocese of Manila. Although restorations were initially expected to be completed in 2013, the initial deadline was missed. However, Msgr. Nestor Cerbo stated that the cathedral would finish its renovations on March 25, 2014. Some added features and changes include the installation of CCTV cameras, large flat screen television screens (similar to those found in Baclaran Church), improved audio-video systems, and improved interior and exterior LED lightings. The cathedral completed its restoration on the said date and was reopened to the general public on April 9, 2014, after two years of renovation. Manila Archbishop Luis Antonio Cardinal Tagle presided a Holy Mass, after the reopening of the cathedral, attended by President Benigno Aquino III.

On January 16, 2015, Pope Francis celebrated his first Papal Mass in the country at the cathedral as part of his apostolic visit to the Philippines. The mass was celebrated for the bishops, priests, and the clergy in three languages: Latin, English, and Filipino.

Architecture and design

Built in the Neo-Romanesque architecture style in a cruciform layout, the northwest façade is a replica of the façade of the previous cathedral, along with statues of famous saints sculpted in Roman travertine stone. Several of the artworks inside the basilica were made by Italian artists. In the previous cathedral, they were originally made of molave wood. The statue of Saint Rose of Lima was sculpted by Angelo Fattinanzi; Saint Jacob, Saint Andrew, and Saint Anthony the Abbot by Livia Papini; and Saint Francis Xavier and Saint Polycarp by Alcide Tico. The tympanum above the central northwest doors bears the Latin inscription Tibi cordi tuo immaculato concredimus nos ac consecramus (English: "To thy Immaculate Heart, entrust us and consecrate us").

Since Pope John Paul II's apostolic visit to the basilica in 1981, a medallion bearing the papal arms has been placed beneath the cross of the façade. The scarlet galeros of Cardinals Rufino Santos and Jaime Sin are also suspended from the ceiling of the dome. In addition, a copy of the Saint Peter Enthroned statue of St. Peter's Basilica is enshrined inside, across a polychrome life-sized statue of the Immaculate Conception.

The baptismal font and angel-shaped holy water fonts are also made of solid bronze by Publio Morbiducci; the prominent mosaic of Saint Jude Thaddeus was made by Marcello Mazzoli. The 134 modern stained glass windows were made in 1964 by Filipino artist Galo Ocampo. The window set, which was a programme of Marian themes, was commissioned and funded by Cardinal Santos.
 
The artistic designs of the stained glass windows of the Manila Cathedral are mostly products of the creative genius of Ocampo, one of the most versatile contemporary Filipino artists during his time and a recipient of the 1964 Patnubay ng Sining at Kalinangan Award from the city government of Manila.

The marble floors on the center aisle near the altar bears the coat of arms of four cardinal archbishops of Manila: Rufino Santos, Jaime Sin, Gaudencio Rosales, and Luis Antonio Tagle.

Cathedra
The cathedra or episcopal throne of the Archbishop of Manila was installed during the postwar reconstruction in 1958. It is made of Mexican onyx and marble from Carrara, Italy, and was designed and made by the Istituto Internazionale d’Arte Liturgica in Rome.

The original cathedra bears the coat of arms of then Archbishop Rufino Santos before he was created a cardinal. His coat of arms and the Mexican onyx was covered by a stone until its restoration in 2021.

The restored cathedra now bears a carving of the coat of arms Cardinal Jose Advincula, the present archbishop, imposed on top of white Indian marble.

Patroness

The cathedral is dedicated to the Blessed Virgin Mary under the title of the Immaculate Conception, which is honored as the Principal Patroness of the Philippines. The  bronze statue, designed by national Italian sculptor Vincenzo Assenza (1915–1981), is located above the high altar.

Prior to 1988, the bronze statue was painted gold until 1988 (though the twelve star halo-aureola is solid gold). Inscribed on the baldachin above the statue of the Immaculate Conception is the Latin antiphon Tota pulchra es, Maria, et macula originalis non est in Te (English: "Thou art all-beautiful, Mary, and the original stain [spot] (of sin) is not in thee.").

Pope Gregory XIII in 1581 issued a papal bull consecrating the cathedral building to The Purest and Immaculate Conception of Mary, while Miguel López de Legazpi consecrated the city of Manila to Saint Potenciana. Pope Pius XII, on September 12, 1942, reiterated this patronage for the Filipino people to La Purísima Inmaculada Concepción through the papal bull Impositi Nobis, while Saint Rose of Lima and Saint Potenciana remained as the secondary patronesses of the Filipino people. The same Pontiff  through “Quidquid ad Dilatandum” reiterated this declaration of patronage on July 16, 1958, through the chancellor of apostolic briefs, Gildo Brugnola, who signed and executed the decree.

Shrine rectors
 Artemio Gabriel Casas, (1956–1962)
 Jose C. Abriol, P.A. (1962–1975)
 Augusto Pedrosa, H.P. (1975–1985)
 Domingo A. Cirilos Jr., P.C.  (1985–1996)
 Hernando M. Coronel, P.C. (1996–2002)
 Nestor C. Cerbo, P.C. (2002–2015)
 Reginald R. Malicdem, (2015–2022)
 Rolando dela Cruz, (2022–present)

Burials and funerals
The cathedral crypt is the resting place for former archbishops of Manila and a few other prelates, located underneath the church complex and accessible by a stairway to the right of the altar:

Michael J. O'Doherty, the last foreign archbishop of Manila
Gabriel M. Reyes, the first Filipino archbishop of Manila
Rufino J. Cardinal Santos, the first Filipino cardinal
Jaime L. Cardinal Sin, a prominent leader of the 1986 People Power Revolution
Dom Ambrose Agius, bishop and Apostolic Delegate to the Philippines (until 1945; remains transferred to the Abbey of Our Lady of Montserrat, Mendiola Street, Manila)

Three former presidents were permitted to lie in state under the cathedral dome:
Emilio Aguinaldo, 1st president of the Philippines (1899-1901) (d.1964)
Carlos P. Garcia, 8th president of the Philippines (1957–1961) (d. 1971)
Corazon C. Aquino, 11th president of the Philippines (1986–1992) (d. 2009)

President Aguinaldo was the first president to have a requiem mass said in the restored cathedral. Although he was a freemason and was closely associated with the Aglipayan Church, his remains were brought to the cathedral and laid beneath the dome on February 14, 1964. Rufino J. Cardinal Santos officiated the requiem mass before the remains were brought to the Legislative Building for the state vigil.  President Garcia was the first layman to lie-in-state and have his Requiem Mass said at the cathedral; President Aquino was the third layperson and the first woman given this honour during her funeral. This broke with centuries of tradition that reserved the right of lying-in-state beneath the dome to archbishops of Manila.

Gallery

See also

 Manila Cathedral-Basilica Re-Opening (April 9, 2014 Eucharist after Restoration and Retrofitting)
Roman Catholic Archdiocese of Manila
Roman Catholicism in the Philippines
San Agustin Church
Intramuros

Notes

References

External links

 Official website of Manila Cathedral

Roman Catholic churches in Manila
Roman Catholic cathedrals in the Philippines
Buildings and structures in Intramuros
Cultural Properties of the Philippines in Metro Manila
Tourist attractions in Manila
Romanesque Revival church buildings in the Philippines
Basilica churches in the Philippines
Roman Catholic churches completed in 1958
20th-century Roman Catholic church buildings in the Philippines
Churches in the Roman Catholic Archdiocese of Manila